Prospects Course Exchange is a system that manages XCRI-CAP feeds, enabling course data from higher education providers to be visible through Prospects' postgraduate course search.

It is run and operated by Graduate Prospects.

Prospects Course Check is a free course validation checker also provided by the service.

See also 

 XCRI

References

External links 

Official site
Official site

Debugging
Education in Manchester
Educational charities based in the United Kingdom
Graduate recruitment
Higher education organisations based in the United Kingdom
Information technology organisations based in the United Kingdom
Organisations based in Manchester